Otedola is a Yoruba surname and some of the popular names called otedola in yoruba shall be listed below surname. It may refer to:

Femi Otedola (born 1962), Nigerian businessman, entrepreneur philanthropist
Sir Michael Otedola (1926–2014), Nigerian politician and the former Governor of Lagos State, Nigeria
Florence Ifeoluwa Otedola Nigerian DJ
 Temi Otedola Nigerian actress and fashion blogger

Yoruba-language surnames
Surnames of Nigerian origin